Susan Vanita Diol (born May 25, 1962) is an American television actress who has played supporting roles in over forty series, including Quantum Leap, One Life to Live, Star Trek: The Next Generation, Star Trek: Voyager, NCIS, and CSI: Crime Scene Investigation.

Career
Diol acted in children's theatre productions in Illinois before beginning her on-screen career. In 1990, Diol appeared in two episodes of the TV series Night Court, playing Dan Fielding's (John Larroquette) sister Donna. On November 21, 1991, she appeared in Seinfeld episode no. 26, "The Nose Job", as Audrey (the one who had the nose job). On November 7, 1995, Diol appeared in an episode of the TV series Wings, playing a call girl whom Joe and Brian inadvertently choose as a rebound date for lovelorn Antonio.

Diol has played several roles of interest to fans of science fiction television. She played Carmen Davila in the Star Trek: The Next Generation episode “Silicon Avatar”. She also appeared on Star Trek: Voyager as Doctor Danara Pel in the episodes “Lifesigns” and “Resolutions”. In Quantum Leap, she played Al Calavicci's first wife, Beth, in two episodes, including the series finale. She reprises the role of Beth in the 2022 revival series.

Selected filmography

Personal life
Diol graduated from Otterbein College in Westerville, Ohio. She has married four times: to Jerry Rapp (1991–1993), Shaun Cassidy (1995–2003), Andy Cadiff (2003–2010), and William Newkirk (until 2016). During her marriage to Cassidy, Diol had a child named Juliet Jones Diol-Cassidy (born 1998).

References

External links
 
 

1962 births
American television actresses
Otterbein University alumni
Living people
Actresses from Michigan
American film actresses
20th-century American actresses
21st-century American actresses
People from Worthington, Ohio